Aepylopha is a genus of moths in the family Geometridae. It contains only one species, Aepylopha thalassia, which is found in Australia.

References

External links

 

Moths described in 1942
Eupitheciini
Geometridae genera
Monotypic moth genera
Taxa named by Alfred Jefferis Turner
Moths of Australia